The Resource Conservation and Development Program (RC&D), initiated in 1962 under authority of Food and Agriculture Act of 1962 (P.L. 87-703), assists multi-county areas in enhancing conservation, water quality, wildlife habitat, recreation and rural development. Work in each area is coordinated by a council. At present, 375 areas have been approved encompassing more than 2,500 counties.

The RC&D Program is a nationwide USDA program administered by the Natural Resources Conservation Service (NRCS).  The purpose of the RC&D program is to accelerate the conservation, development, and utilization of natural resources, improve the general level of economic activity, and to enhance the environment and standard of living in designated RC&D areas.  Current program objectives focus on improvement of quality of life achieved through natural resources conservation and community development which leads to sustainable communities, prudent use (development), and the management and conservation of natural resources.

RC&D areas are locally sponsored areas designated by the Secretary of Agriculture for RC&D technical and financial assistance program funds.  Once the Area has been designated by the Secretary of Agriculture, USDA provides a staff person, the RC&D Coordinator, to assist the local group in developing a Council and assists the Council in carrying out its objectives and goals by providing guidance, advice, and “technical assistance.”  In general, the Coordinator is a facilitator, advisor, and coach to the RC&D Council.  In addition to the Federal RC&D Coordinator, USDA also provides office space and appropriate basic support for program administration.

The RC&D Council is the heart of the RC&D concept.  The Council is a sponsorship-based on nonprofit entity that is established and run by volunteers to carry out the mission of the RC&D.  The Council is composed of members that are key community leaders in land conservation, water management, environmental enhancement, and community development.  They are a steering committee and action team to implement the “Area Plan”, a community-driven strategic long-range plan to improve the quality of life in the communities in the RC&D Area.
The RC&D Council members need to be action-oriented volunteers and leaders that help the Council address needs in the community through good planning and project implementation.  In this “make it happen” style, the Council also periodically evaluates its progress on the Area Plan and gathers input from the community.  The Council members represent all the counties of the Area.

References

External links
.

Nature conservation organizations based in the United States